Dilnawaz is a 2017 Pakistani supernatural romantic drama serial directed Najaf Billgrami, produced by Aijaz Aslam and written by Syed Nabeel. The series features Neelam Muneer, Minal Khan, Wahaj Ali as the main cast and Najaf Billgrami, Waseem Abbas, Shazia Shah, Nida Mumtaz, Humaira Bano and Zainab Qayyum as the other cast.

Cast
Neelam Muneer as Dilnawaz
Minal Khan as Kiran
Wahaj Ali as Fawad
Najaf Billgrami as Majbzoob
Waseem Abbas as Khalid
Shazia Shah as Jahan Ara
Nida Mumtaz as Rasheeda
Zainab Qayyum as Alam Ara 
Humaira Bano as Kiran's Mother

Soundtrack

The soundtrack is sung by Alycia Dias.

References

Pakistani drama television series
2017 Pakistani television series debuts
2017 Pakistani television series endings
Urdu-language television shows
A-Plus TV original programming
Pakistani horror fiction television series